Allium roylei is a plant species found high in the Himalayas of Pakistan, Afghanistan and India. It has an egg-shaped bulb up to 30 mm across, and a scape up to 40 cm tall. Umbel is hemispherical, with reddish flowers.

References

roylei
Onions
Flora of West Himalaya
Flora of Afghanistan
Flora of Pakistan
Plants described in 1947